Henry Waldegrave, 1st Baron Waldegrave (166124 January 1689) was an English peer and Jacobite supporter.

Early life
He was the son of Sir Charles Waldegrave, 3rd Baronet and Eleanor, Lady Waldegrave ( Englefield), a daughter of Sir Francis Englefield, 2nd Baronet.

Career

Waldegrave inherited his father's title, becoming 4th Baronet Waldegrave, of Hever Castle, in about 1684. As a result of his marriage, he was raised to the peerage as Baron Waldegrave, of Chewton, Somerset, in 1686.
 
He became Comptroller of the Household in 1687 and continued in this office at the King's court-in-exile at Saint-Germain-en-Laye, until his death in 1689. In 1688, he was appointed to succeed Bevil Skelton as the English Ambassador to France, serving until 1689.

Personal life
On  29 November 1683, he married Henrietta FitzJames (1667–1730), an illegitimate daughter of King James II and his mistress, Arabella Churchill (sister of John Churchill, 1st Duke of Marlborough).  He had three children:

 James Waldegrave, 1st Earl Waldegrave (1684–1741), who married Mary Webb, daughter of Sir John Webb, 3rd Baronet, in 1714.
 Hon. Arabella Waldegrave (1687–1740), who became a nun.
 Hon. Henry Waldegrave (1688–)

Lord Waldegrave died on 24 January 1689. After his death, his widow married Piers Butler, 3rd Viscount Galmoye.

Descendants
Through his son James, he was a grandfather of James Waldegrave, 2nd Earl Waldegrave, John Waldegrave, 3rd Earl Waldegrave, and Lady Henrietta Waldegrave (who married Lord Edward Herbert, a son of the 2nd Marquess of Powis; and secondly, John Beard (a singer at Covent Garden). He was also a 7th great grandfather of Diana, Princess of Wales, first wife of Charles III.

References

|-

|-

1661 births
1689 deaths
Barons Waldegrave
Peers of England created by James II
English Jacobites
Ambassadors of England to France
Lord-Lieutenants of Somerset
Henry Waldegrave, 1st Baron Waldegrave
People from Hever, Kent